Shannon Emery Lee Keasler (born April 19, 1969) is an American actress and businesswoman. She is the only living child of martial artist Bruce Lee and retired martial arts teacher Linda Lee Cadwell, and is the younger sister of actor Brandon Lee. Through Bruce Lee she is a granddaughter of Cantonese opera singer Lee Hoi-chuen.

Early life
Shannon was born on April 19, 1969, at UCLA Medical Center, Santa Monica in Santa Monica, California. She is the youngest child and only daughter of martial arts film star Bruce Lee and Linda Emery. In her youth she studied Jeet Kune Do, the martial art created by her father, under Richard Bustillo, one of her father's students.

Career
In 1993, Lee played a party singer in her father's biopic Dragon: The Bruce Lee Story. In 1994, she acted in Cage II. In 1997, Lee acted in High Voltage.

In 1998, Lee acted in the Hong Kong action film Enter the Eagles, directed by Corey Yuen, co-starring Michael Wong and Anita Yuen. In the film, Lee had a fight scene with Benny Urquidez, who went on to teach her kickboxing. On television, she guest-starred in an episode of the television series Martial Law alongside Sammo Hung.

In 2000, Lee sang a cover of "I'm in the Mood for Love" for the film China Strike Force directed by Stanley Tong.

Lee appeared in the sci-fi television film Epoch, which first aired on the Sci Fi Channel in 2001. That same year, she played the leading role in the action film Lessons for an Assassin. She was also the host of the first season of the game show WMAC Masters.

Lee sang on the band Medicine's album The Mechanical Forces of Love in 2003.

Lee is president of the Bruce Lee Foundation. She was the executive producer of the 2008 television series The Legend of Bruce Lee, based on her father's life, and the 2009 documentary film How Bruce Lee Changed the World.

In 2015, Perfect Storm Entertainment and Shannon Lee announced that the series Warrior, based on an original idea by Bruce Lee, would be produced and air on Cinemax. Filmmaker Justin Lin was chosen to direct the series, which debuted April 5, 2019.

Personal life 
Lee's husband is Ian Keasler. They share a daughter named Wren.

Lee is the daughter of Bruce Lee, granddaughter of Lee Hoi-chuen and Grace Ho, sister of Brandon Lee, and niece of Robert Lee Jun-fai and Peter Lee Jung-sum. Lee's paternal great-grandfather was Ho Kom Tong, half-brother of Robert Hotung.

Martial arts 
In her youth, Lee studied Jeet Kune Do, with her father's disciple Richard Bustillo, but did not practice it seriously until the late 1990s. To train for parts in action movies, she studied Jeet Kune Do with Ted Wong.

She studied Taekwondo under Tan Tao-liang AKA "Flash Legs" and Wushu under Eric Chen. She also studied under the tutelage of the director of Enter the Eagles, Yuen De, Jackie Chan's Chinese opera brother. Because the film Enter the Eagles required her to fight Benny Urquidez, Urquidez himself taught her kickboxing.

Filmography

References

Further reading

External links
 
 
The Bruce Lee Foundation Official Website  

1969 births
Living people
American actresses of Chinese descent
American film actresses
Television personalities from Los Angeles
American women television personalities
Television producers from California
American women television producers
American Jeet Kune Do practitioners
American female kickboxers
American wushu practitioners
American female taekwondo practitioners
Actresses from Los Angeles
People from Rolling Hills, California
Actresses from Seattle
20th-century American actresses
21st-century American actresses
American rock singers
American people of Dutch-Jewish descent
Chinese Jeet Kune Do practitioners
Family of Bruce Lee
American born Hong Kong artists